Dales ware is a type of pottery produced in the South Yorkshire and Lincolnshire areas of England and widely distributed across northern Britain during the 3rd and 4th centuries AD.

Industry
Dales ware was predominantly produced in north Lincolnshire, but had other production centres in Yorkshire, and was traded northwards, east of the Pennines in the 3rd and 4th Centuries AD. It most commonly occurs as jars.

Fabric

Dales Ware
Dales ware is a handmade, shell-tempered coarseware ceramic with a distinctive rim, often wheel-formed. The fabric is rough and coloured brown-grey. It often includes irregular finger indentations around the lower body, but is generally smoothed towards the shoulder and over the rim and lip.

Dales-type ware
The Dales-type ware was defined by Loughlin. The fabric differs in being hard-fired and grey, in comparison to the above. Dales-type jars are always more numerous than true Dales ware and were popular as burial urns in Roman York.

See also
Eboracum
Crambeck Ware
Ancient Roman Pottery
List of Romano-British pottery

References

Romano-British pottery